The 2011–12 season was Ludogorets Razgrad's first season in the A Football Group. Ludogorets Razgrad won their first
Bulgarian Cup on 16 May, defeating Lokomotiv Plovdiv 2–1, before completing the domestic double a week later by defeating CSKA Sofia 1–0 on 23 May 2012 to claim their first top flight league title.

Squad

Transfers

In

Loans in

Out

Loans out

Released

Competitions

Friendlies

Bulgarian A Professional Football Group

League table

Results summary

Results by round

Fixtures and results

Bulgarian Cup

Final

Squad statistics

Appearances and goals

|-
|colspan="14"|Players who appeared for Ludogorets Razgrad no longer at the club:

|}

Goal scorers

Disciplinary record

References

Ludogorets Razgrad
PFC Ludogorets Razgrad seasons
Bulgarian football championship-winning seasons